Fernando Cuerda Peña (born 6 March 1984 in Seville, Andalusia) is a Spanish retired footballer who played as a central defender.

External links

Stats at HLSZ 

1984 births
Living people
Footballers from Seville
Spanish footballers
Association football defenders
Segunda División B players
Sevilla Atlético players
Mérida UD footballers
Atlético Madrid B players
Real Valladolid Promesas players
Football League (Greece) players
Kavala F.C. players
Nemzeti Bajnokság I players
Budapest Honvéd FC players
Ekstraklasa players
I liga players
Piast Gliwice players
Spanish expatriate footballers
Expatriate footballers in Greece
Expatriate footballers in Hungary
Expatriate footballers in Morocco
Expatriate footballers in Poland
Spanish expatriate sportspeople in Hungary
Spanish expatriate sportspeople in Poland